São Francisco do Sul is a municipality in the Brazilian state of Santa Catarina. It covers an area of 540 km² (208 miles2) and had an estimated population of 53,746 in 2020.

Location
It was founded as a village by the Portuguese in 1658.  Despite the date of its foundation, there's a previous record that a famous navigator left Honfleur, Normandy in France by the year of 1503 and arrived at São Francisco do Sul, at the Bay of Babitonga, Jean Binot Paulmier De Gonneville is also recognised by many historians as one of the first, if not the first, Europeans to arrive.   It is situated on the northern end of the Island of São Francisco at the entrance to the Babitonga Bay.

São Francisco do Sul is an important part of the Brazilian infrastructure. It provides large bulk shipping facilities and is served by the major container shipping lines connecting with the South American east and west coasts, Africa, Asia, North and Central America, the Caribbean and Europe.

During the past decade, São Francisco do Sul has become a popular tourism destination for South American and international guests.
The municipality contains the  Acaraí State Park, created in 2005.

International relations

Twin towns – Sister cities
São Francisco do Sul is twinned with:
 Honfleur, Calvados, France

References

External links

 Tour Virtual of São Francisco do Sul - Brazilian Site
Official site of the port of Sao Francisco do Sul

Populated coastal places in Santa Catarina (state)
Populated places established in 1658
Municipalities in Santa Catarina (state)
1658 establishments in the Portuguese Empire